= Disability in South Sudan =

Disability in South Sudan refers to the status and experiences of individuals with disabilities within the country of South Sudan. As reported by the international disability charity organization, Light of the World, approximately 250,000 individuals with disabilities reside in South Sudan.

== Legislation ==
In 2015, South Sudan enacted a law aimed at supporting the rights and needs of disabled persons.

== Organisations ==
The National Union of Disabled Peoples Organisations (NUDPO) was founded in September 2020 as an umbrella organization to advocate for the rights and interests of disabled South Sudanese. NUDPO comprises eight constituent organizations, including the South Sudan Women with Disabilities Network and the South Sudan National Association for the Deaf.
